The Legislative Assembly of Assiniboia was a short-lived legislature established to pass laws for the North-Western Territory and Rupert's Land under the provisional government led by Louis Riel from 1869 to 1870. The Legislative Assembly was named after the Council of Assiniboia that previously managed the territories before the Hudson's Bay Company sold the land to Canada in 1869.

The guidelines for the creation of the elected assembly had been established during the Convention of Forty in January and February 1870 and elections followed shortly afterwards. The number of representatives of constituencies considered to be English-speaking and those considered to be French-speaking were made equal. The assembly operated from March 9, 1870, to June 24, 1870. Its final act was to accept the agreement negotiated with Canada for the new province of Manitoba to enter Confederation and to ratify the Manitoba Act.

Executive officers of the provisional government

Legislative Council

References 

Rupert's Land
Historical legislatures
1869 in politics
1870 establishments in the British Empire
1870 disestablishments in the British Empire
District of Assiniboia
Louis Riel
1870 in Manitoba
North-Western Territory